Vitalia Diatchenko and Olga Savchuk were the defending champions, having won the event in 2013, however they both chose to participate with different partners. Diatchenko partnered Alexandra Panova and Savchuk partnered Lyudmyla Kichenok and both faced each other in the final, with Diatchenko and Panova defeating Kichenok and Savchuk, 3–6, 6–2, [10–4].

Seeds

Draw

References 
 Draw

Al Habtoor Tennis Challenge - Doubles
Al Habtoor Tennis Challenge
2014 in Emirati tennis